Darreh Kuran (also Romanized as Darreh Kūrān, Darreh-i-Kurun, Darreh Kooran, and Darreh-ye Kūrān) is a village in Arabkhaneh Rural District, Shusef District, Nehbandan County, South Khorasan Province, Iran. At the 2006 census, its population was 91, in 23 families.

References 

Populated places in Nehbandan County